Patricia de Jesus (born May 7, 1977), known as Pathy De Jesus is a Brazilian actress, model and television presenter.

Filmography

References

External links

1979 births
Living people
Actresses from São Paulo
Afro-Brazilian actresses
Afro-Brazilian female models
Brazilian television actresses
Brazilian television presenters
Afro-Brazilian women
Brazilian women television presenters